Bud Estes (October 4, 1946 – February 13, 2021) was an American politician. He was a Republican member of the Kansas Senate for the 38th district, from 2017 until his death, and previously served as the 119th district state representative. Estes also served as the mayor of Bucklin, Kansas, for fourteen years. 

Estes died in February 2021, after being hospitalized due to a prolonged illness.

Committee membership
Estes has served on the following legislative committees:
 Health & Human Services
 Insurance & Financial Institutions
 Federal and State Affairs

References

1946 births
2021 deaths
20th-century American politicians
21st-century American politicians
Fort Hays State University alumni
Republican Party Kansas state senators
Mayors of places in Kansas
Republican Party members of the Kansas House of Representatives
People from Dodge City, Kansas
People from Ford County, Kansas